O Jin-u (March 8, 1917 – February 25, 1995) was a North Korean general and politician. He served with Kim Il-sung's partisan unit and eventually rose through the ranks of the North Korean Army. He distinguished himself during the Korean War and was a trusted adviser of the North Korean leader until his death, also being his chief guard in 1945. Thanks to his relationship with Kim Il-sung, O Jin-u was able to enjoy wealth and fame, this lasted even under Kim Jong-il. He was the Minister of Armed Forces from May 1976 until his death in February 1995. O was considered the third-most powerful person in North Korea, after Kim Il-sung and his son Kim Jong-il, therefore making him the most powerful person that possessed no blood relations to the Kim family. He is considered a hardliner and advocated North Korea's nuclear program.

Career 

Born into a poor peasant family in Bukcheong, South Gyeongsang Province, O moved to Manchuria in 1933 and participated in anti-Japanese activity. During his partisan activities, he joined with Kim Il-sung to serve as a military officer in the Northeast Anti-Japanese Army in 1938. In 1933, during the Japanese colonial period, he participated in Kim Il-sung's anti-Japanese guerrillas and was mainly active in the Dongman region and East Man region and after the Japanese army's subjugation activities against the anti-Japanese armed groups intensified, he evacuated to the Soviet Union with Kim Il-sung and enlisted in the Soviet Army to serve as a non-commissioned officer. Then, on September 19, 1945, he returned to Wonsan Port with Kim Il-sung as a member of Kim Il-sung's 88th International Brigade Chosun Operation Group. At the time of entry, Kim Il-sung still went by 'Kim Seong-Ju'. Returning to North Korea, O Jin-u was appointed as the head of the Pyongyang Police Station, starting with the head of the Supreme Command's escort bureau, and then in September 1946, he became the military vice-president of the Central Security Officer School. In February 1948, he joined the recently established Korean People's Army and served as the chief of staff of a brigade. In 1949, he served as the principal of the military school. O Jin-u was one of the founders of the North Korean Army, helping set up the groundwork for the service. 

After the Korean War broke out, he became the Commander of the 43rd Division (North Korea). He led the 766th Independent Infantry Regiment in the attack against the Busan Ring Defensive Circle. After the war, he was the commanding general of the 3rd Division (North Korea) and in 1958, he was awarded the Order of the National Flag. He had a close relationship with Kim Jong-il in, starting at his birth, in where O treated him like his own son. O rose rapidly through military ranks: he was promoted to the Ministry of the People's Armed Forces in 1976 after serving as the head of the 3rd Military Academy in Hoeryong, the division commander, the corps commander, the group commander, the general staff of the People's Army, and the vice-minister of the National Security Agency. He was appointed chief of staff of the Korean People's Air Force in 1958, vice-minister of the Ministry of People's Security in 1962, General in 1963, director of the KPA General Political Bureau in 1967 and Chief of the General Staff in 1968. This concurred with his ascent to the top leadership of the Workers' Party of Korea, becoming a Central Committee member in 1954, a Political Committee (former name of the Politburo) member in 1966, a Secretariat member in 1968 and a Presidium member in 1977. 

As the Head of the Korean People's Army, O Jin-u is seen as the main perpetrator of both the Korean axe murder incident and the Rangoon bombing as both were committed by the military. During his rise, he greatly helped Kim Il-sung in his purges of the military. In the beginning, he was more favorable to Kim Jong-il's half-brother, Kim Pyong-il because he is regarded as more capable than Kim Jong-il who had no military experience even though he helped raise Kim Jong-il while serving as a chief guard. From his anti-Japanese partisan view point, Kim Jong-il did not look like an orthodox communist. O Jin-u, being the most powerful figure of the Korean People's Army who commanded the army with the absolute trust of Kim Il-sung, Kim Jong-il who regards O as was a formidable opponent to have, begins to convince O Jin-u, who was trusted by his father, rather than eliminate him, and eventually, he turned O Jin-u into a supporter of Kim Jong-il. This change was seen as the main reason why Kim Pyong-il was dropped as a successor. After that, O Jin-u played a leading role in establishing Kim Jong-il as the successor. Becoming extremely close to Kim Il-sung, he is credited among the top officials who "proposed" Kim Jong-il to be Kim Il-sung's heir at a Central Committee plenum in 1974. and helped him take control of the military O championed Kim Jong-il's cause, particularly within the military.

A deputy to the Supreme People's Assembly since 1960, O was appointed member of the top  immediately after its establishment in 1972, as well as vice-chairman of the National Defence Commission and Minister of the People's Armed Forces in 1976. He was also promoted to Vice Marshal in 1985 and Marshal in 1992, one of only three military officers in the North Korean Armed Forces to be granted the rank.

After Kim Jong-il was made Chairman of the National Defence Commission in 1993, O replaced him as its first vice-chairman. In 1990, after the collapse of the socialist bloc, he led the emergency system. He also was the second-ranking member of the Kim Il-sung funeral committee in 1994, immediately beneath Kim Jong-il. He was also the last surviving WPK Presidium member along with the new leader.

According to the testimony of film director Shin Sang-ok, who was abducted from North Korea, "O Jin-u once said that if he was drunk, he would wipe out Busan in a week if the general commanded him. Lunch in Daejeon, dinner in Busan... "

In January 2017, it was reported that his three sons, O Il-hun, O Il-jong and O Il-su had been "purged" by Kim Jong-un. There was no official reason given on why it occurred; however, it is believed that Kim Jong-un because he viewed their relation to O as a possible threat to his rule of the DPRK. Considering how revered O was in the DPRK to still receive the title of "Revolutionary Martyr", the incident shocked observers, as respected officials' relatives tended to be well taken care of.

Illness and death 
O Jin-u, who had been victorious in the North Korean regime, suffered a worsening case of lung cancer, and his frequency of public appearances decreased significantly during this time. He went to France to receive treatment under Kim Jong-il's special consideration, but he did not show any signs of recovery and finally died in February 1995 while fighting the disease in Pyongyang, 
a year after Kim Il-sung. Since O was a major supporter for Kim Jong-il's succession, which had not been fully realized at the time of his death, the event was seen as a setback for Kim. After O's death, Kim Jong-il left the minister's position vacant for more than seven months before naming a new minister, Choi Kwang. O Jin-u is deeply imprinted with a warlike appearance, and the first person that comes to mind when many people think of the North Korean People's Army is O Jin-u.

A funeral committee of 240 members was appointed for O. It included:

 Kim Jong-il
 Kang Song-san
 Ri Jong-ok
 Pak Song-chol
 Kim Yong-ju
 Kim Yong-nam
 Choe Kwang
 Kye Ung-thae
 Chon Pyong-ho
 Han Song-yong
 
 Kim Chol-man
 Choe Tae-pok
 Choe Yong-nim
 Hong Song-nam
 Yang Hyong-sop
 Hong Sok-hyong
 Yon Hyon-muk

Awards and honors 
A frame with O's awards and honors was displayed during his funeral, showing all the decorations he had received.

Five autographed wristwatches and one pocket watch featuring Kim Il Sung's signature

 Hero of the Republic, twice

 Order of Kim Il-sung, three times

 Order of the National Flag First Class, thirteen times

 Order of Freedom and Independence First Class, seven times

 Order of Korean Labour, four times

 Commemorative Order "Foundation of the Democratic People's Republic of Korea"

 Commemorative Order "Anniversary of the Foundation of the People's Army"

 Order of Military Service Honour First Class

 Commemorative Order "30th Anniversary of the Agricultural Presentation"

 Order of the National Flag Second Class, three times

 Order of Freedom and Independence Second Class, twice

 Order of the National Flag Third Class, twice

 Commemorative Order "Capital Construction"

 Commemorative Order "60th Anniversary of the People's Army"

 Commemorative Order "40th Anniversary of Fatherland Liberation War Victory"

 Commemorative Medal "Fatherland Liberation"

 Commemorative Medal "The Foundation of the People's Republic of Korea", twice

 Medal For Military Merit

 Medal of Military Service Honour

Works

References

Sources

External links

|-

|-

|-

|-

|-

|-

|-

|-

|-

|-

|-

|-

|-

|-

|-

North Korean military personnel
North Korean military personnel of the Korean War
Marshals
Korean independence activists
1917 births
1995 deaths
Korean revolutionaries
Government ministers of North Korea
Deaths from lung cancer
Defence ministers of North Korea
Members of the 5th Political Committee of the Workers' Party of Korea
Members of the 6th Presidium of the Workers' Party of Korea
Members of the 3rd Central Committee of the Workers' Party of Korea
Members of the 4th Central Committee of the Workers' Party of Korea
International Lenin School alumni
People from South Hamgyong
People of 88th Separate Rifle Brigade